On the Origin of Time is a 2023 book by physicist Thomas Hertog about the theories of Stephen Hawking.

References

2023 books
Upcoming books
Penguin Books books
Stephen Hawking
Popular physics books